Mohamed Jandoubi (born July 10, 1986), better known by his stage name  Psyco-M, is a Tunisian rapper and songwriter.

Psyco-M gained popularity in 2010, after his numerous conflicts with media. His message is based on Islamism.

Songs

References

External links 

1986 births
Living people
21st-century Tunisian male singers
21st-century rappers
Tunisian rappers